Hlubi Mboya (born 2 March 1978), also known as Hlubi Mboya-Arnold, is a South African actress.

On television, she has portrayed Nandipha Sithole in the soap opera Isidingo.  She also appeared in the 2016 film Dora's Peace, for which she won the SAFTA Award for Best Supporting Actress.
She also received Golden Horn Award for the ‘Best Supporting Actress’ in a Feature Film.

Personal life
Mboya has been married to Kirsten Arnold since 2015.  She is of Hlubi ethnicity, however, Xhosa speaking.

Select filmography
A Small Town Called Descent (2010)
How to Steal 2 Million (2011)
Death Race 3: Inferno (2013)
Avenged (2013)
Hector and the Search for Happiness (2014)
Dora's Peace (2016)
i am All Girls (2021)

References

External links
 

Living people
21st-century South African actresses
South African film actresses
South African television actresses
South African people of Xhosa descent
1978 births